Leysira Gabdrakmanova (born ) is a Russian female artistic gymnast who won the bronze medal in the team event at the 2004 European Women's Artistic Gymnastics Championships.

References

1987 births
Living people
Russian female artistic gymnasts
Place of birth missing (living people)